is a female Japanese manga artist and novelist. She is best known for the series Tokyo Love Story, which was adapted as a live-action television series. She won the 1983 Kodansha Manga Award for general manga for P.S. Genki Desu, Shunpei and the 1992 Shogakukan Manga Award for general manga for Kazoku no Shokutaku and Asunaro Hakusho. She is married to manga artist Kenshi Hirokane.

References

External links 
 
 Profile  at The Ultimate Manga Page

Japanese female comics artists
Female comics writers
Living people
Women manga artists
Manga artists from Tokushima Prefecture
People from Tokushima (city)
Winner of Kodansha Manga Award (General)
1957 births
Japanese women writers
Japanese writers